Los Realejos is a town and a municipality in the northern part of the island of Tenerife, which is the biggest town in the Canary Islands. It is part of the province of Santa Cruz de Tenerife, Spain. The inhabitants are known in Spanish as realejeros.

Los Realejos is the western terminus of the TF-5 motorway.     

The town is split into two distinct areas or districts:
Realejo Alto (Upper Realejo)
Realejo Bajo (Lower Realejo)

These areas are distinct from each other in terms of their geography (a large deep ravine splits both) and their history (during the Spanish conquest of the island, the indigenous people Guanches had a settlement in the lower area of the town. In contrast, the Spaniards occupied the upper area). Furthermore, each area has its own Baroque church, both of which were built shortly after completing the Spanish conquest.  The municipality was originally founded and known as Realejo de Arriba.

The town governed by its local council also includes other smaller villages such as Palo Blanco, Cruz Santa, Mocan, Icod de Alto, and Tigaiga. Over the years, an increase in population and housing have merged into what appears to be one big town nowadays. 

Los Realejos also has a few beaches of note, Playa de El Socorro being the most popular one, not only with the locals but also with tourists.  Other beaches like Playa de Castro and Playa de Fajana are worthy of mention, albeit they are slightly less accessible than El Socorro. Los Realejos is the home of the English language newspaper the Tenerife News. Los Realejos boasts the Shrine of Our Lady of Mount Carmel, which is the main Marian shrine in northern Tenerife.

Historical population

Education
The British School of Tenerife has its Trinity Campus in Los Realejos.

Natives of Los Realejos
José Viera y Clavijo (December 28, 1731, Las Palmas de Gran Canaria - February 21, 1813), a writer, botanist, and a historian.

See also

List of municipalities in Santa Cruz de Tenerife

References

External links

Official web site with information about Los Realejos
Franciscana Cofradía del Nazareno

Municipalities in Tenerife